Alexis Jordan is a National-Record-holding swimmer from Barbados. She swam for Barbados at the 2006 Commonwealth Games, 2006 Central American and Caribbean Games, 2005 World Championships, and CARIFTA and CCCAN Championships.

References

1988 births
Living people
Barbadian female freestyle swimmers
Commonwealth Games competitors for Barbados
Swimmers at the 2006 Commonwealth Games
Barbadian female swimmers
University of Guelph alumni